The Motorettes were a band from the North East England coastal town of Tynemouth. The band was described by the Manchester Evening News as emo and pop punk.  They were signed to Kitchenware Records. Their album "Super Heartbeats" reached #83 on the UK Singles chart.

Discography
Albums
The Motorettes, Kitchenware Records, 2006
 "Super Heartbeats" - 3:07
 "You Gotta Look the Parts" - 2:55
 "Go! Go! Gadget Girl" - 2:16
 "Heart... Stop... Ing" - 4:08
 "I'm on Fire" - 3:14
 "Baby Come Home" - 3:40
 "I Hate to See You Cry" - 4:50
 "The Death of Cool" - 2:45
 "(Do You Wanna Be My) Girlfriend?" - 2:38
 "I Am Blisters, I Am" - 3:25
 "Relax, It's the 80's" - 2:41
 "Vs the Mountain" - 2:30

Singles
"Super Heartbeats", Kitchenware Records, 2005
Split with Kubichek!, Kitchenware Records, 2006 		
"I Am Blisters, I Am", Kitchenware Records, 2006
"You Gotta Look The Parts", Kitchenware Records, 2006

References

External links
Home page
Kitchenware Records page on The Motorettes

Musical groups established in 2006
Musical groups from Tyne and Wear